Casa de la Moneda or Casa de Moneda is Spanish for mint (coin) (literally, house of money) and is the name of many buildings and institutions:

 Casa de Moneda de la República Argentina, mint and museum
 Casa de la Moneda de Bolivia
 Casa de Moneda de Colombia, former mint, now a museum
 Casa de la Moneda in Mariquita, Tolima, Colombia, 150 km north-west of Bogotá
 Casa de Moneda de México
 Real Casa de la Moneda y Timbre de Manila, the Manila Mint, Philippines
Spain
 Fábrica Nacional de Moneda y Timbre – Real Casa de la Moneda, Royal Mint of Spain
 Casa de Moneda de Jubia, Spain
 The Casa de la Moneda in Segovia, Spain
 The Casa de la Moneda in Ciudad Colonial (Santo Domingo), Dominican Republic 
 Casa de la Moneda in Tegucigalpa, Honduras

See also

 Palacio de La Moneda, Chile
 List of mints